Monufia Governorate is one of the governorates of Egypt. It is located in the northern part of the country in the Nile Delta, to the south of Gharbia Governorate and to the north of Cairo. The governorate is named after Menouf, an ancient city which was the capital of the governorate until 1826. The current governor (as of 2018) is Said Mohammed Mohammed Abbas.

Municipal divisions
The governorate is divided into municipal divisions, with a total estimated population as of July 2017 of 4,319,082. In some instances there is a markaz and a kism with the same name.

Population
According to population estimates in 2015, the majority of residents in the governorate lived in rural areas, with an urbanization rate of only 20.6%. Out of an estimated 3,941,293 people residing in the governorate, 3,128,460 people lived in rural areas as opposed to only 812,833 in urban areas.

Cities
The capital of the Monufia Governorate is the city of Shibin El Kom. The main cities of the governorate are Quesna, Tala, Bagour, Menouf, Ashmoun and Sers El Lyan. It is mainly an agricultural governorate.

Shibin El Kom 
Menouf
Ashmoun 
Sers El Lyan 
 Tala 
 El Bagour
El Shohada 
Sadat City
Quesna 
Birket El Sab
Shanawan

Industrial zones
According to the Egyptian Governing Authority for Investment and Free Zones (GAFI), in affiliation with the Ministry of Investment (MOI), the following industrial zones are located in this governorate:
Mubarak Industrial Zone and its expansion.
Industrial Zones In kafr Dawod.
 (New urban community industrial zone) El Sadat.
Industrial zone El lawy stud ran by El doc ramy.

History
In 1826, Mohammed Ali transferred the capital of Monufia from Menouf to Shibin El Kom as the latter fell exactly in the center of the governorate. Other than Shibin El Kom, the governorate had four other administrative divisions which are Quesna, Tala, Menouf and Talawy. In 1942, El Shohada became a new administrative division and included parts from Shibin El Kom and Tala. In 1947, Bagour was created to encompass regions from Menouf, Talawy, Quesna and Shibin El Kom. In 1955, five villages were taken from Tala and redistributed to Tanta. In 1960, Berket El Sabe'e (Lake of the Lion) was established and consisted of former towns and villages of Tala, Quesna and Shibin El Kom. In 1975, Sers El Lyan became a city rather than a village after it was separated from Menouf. In 1991, Sadat City was annexed to Monufia, being its only region west of the Rosetta branch. In the final round of the 2012 Egyptian presidential election, Monufia had the highest voter turnout rate of all governorates (61.5%) as well as the most overwhelming support for candidate Ahmed Shafik (71.5%).

Agriculture

The governorate is famous for the production of crops like cotton, maize and wheat as well as vegetable crops such as potatoes and green beans of which a large part is exported. Agricultural land is irrigated with water from the Rosetta and Damietta branches of the Nile. Agriculture is generally the main activity of the population due to the fertile land in the Nile Delta.

Notable residents
 

Monufia Governorate is particularly known for being the birthplace of St. Pishoy, born in the village of Shansa (Shensha or Shesna), and of two Egyptian presidents: Anwar Sadat (1918–1981) and Hosni Mubarak (1928-2020). Monufia is also where the parents of Egyptian President Abdel Fattah El-Sisi (b. 1954) originated.
 Naguib El-Helaly Gohar (1944–2015), professor and university president

Projects
In 1981, the Basic Village Service Program (BVS), under the auspices of USAID, had several water, road, and other projects, going on in several markazes in the Monufia Governorate.

In 2018, the National Agricultural Animal Health Services (NAAHS) was formed by the Ministry of Agriculture in order to care for the rising number of infected horses and donkeys in the Shibin El-Kom area. This was sparked by the tragedy.

References

External links
Official Website Arabic
Official Website English
 El Watan News of Monufia Governorate

 
Governorates of Egypt
Nile Delta